Armando Calidonio Alvarado (born 19 September 1969) is a Honduran politician from the National Party of Honduras who since 2014 serves as Mayor of San Pedro Sula. He previously served as Deputy of the National Congress of Honduras during the 2010–2014 period.

References

1969 births
Living people
People from Tegucigalpa
Mayors of places in Honduras
Deputies of the National Congress of Honduras
National Party of Honduras politicians